Woh (English: It) is a 52-episode Indian horror thriller television series which aired on Zee TV in 1998. The series starred Indian film director Ashutosh Gowarikar, and dwarf actor Lilliput in the title role. It is a Hindi-language TV show adaptation of Stephen King's epic horror novel It.

Premise
Seven teenagers Ashutosh, Raja, Julie, Shiva, Ronnie, Sanjeev and Rahul battle an evil force that takes the form of a clown called Woh that kidnaps children, and free the town of Panchgani of his evil influence. They promise to return, if Woh ever returns. Fifteen years after they part ways, Ashutosh starts seeing balloons, at places where children are being kidnapped. He immediately recognizes that Woh has returned and calls his friends to return.

All the friends return except Sanjeev who gets killed by Woh. The day they realize that the police take the friends into custody and they narrate how they battled Woh with the help of Samidha fifteen years ago. The police believe them and release them. They go and meet Samidha and she joins their group. They finish Woh with difficulty. The same day Ashutosh learns his wife is pregnant. Raja proposes to Samidha. All the friends return to their normal lives. Bad omens happen during the birth of Ashutosh's child Siddharth, his doctor and years later Ashutosh's wife's aunt is mysteriously killed. Ashutosh's friends arrive for Siddharth's seventh birthday, they realize Woh has returned in form of Siddharth. They go to the same caves and find out from the mother of Woh that he is her son who faced trouble from the society due to his short height. He killed himself and became a vengeful ghost. The friends convince him to leave Siddharth's body and help him attain salvation. Siddharth is saved and the story ends on a good note.

Cast
 Lilliput as Vikram / Woh 
 Ashutosh Gowarikar as Ashutosh Dhar
 Shreyas Talpade as Young Ashutosh Dhar
 Mamik Singh as Rahul Sahni
 Nasirr Khan as Raja
 Ankur Javeri as Young Raja
 Anupam Bhattacharya as Sanjeev
 Parag Nair as Young Sanjeev
 Amit Mistry as Ronnie Batliwala
 Sumeet Goradia as Young Ronnie Batliwala
 Shonali Malhotra as Samidha Dikshit, Omkarnath's daughter
 Juhi Parmar as Young Samidha Dikshit, Omkarnath's daughter
 Seema Shetty as Julie
 Namrata Gaur as Young Julie
 Ankush Mohla as Shiva
 Adesh Rathi as Young Shiva
 Parzan Dastur as Siddharth Dhar, Ashutosh's son
 Sulabha Deshpande as the mother of Vikram / Woh
 Manoj Joshi as Amit Divecha
 Daya Shankar Pandey as Chandu
 Asif Basra as Omkarnath Dikshit, the history teacher
 Saurabh Dubey as Pinto, Julie's grandfather
 Mukesh Jadhav as Anand
 Iqbal Azad as Inspector Shinde
 Sukanya Kulkarni as Radhika Dhar, Ashutosh's wife
 Prashant Rane as Rohit Sahni, Rahul's brother
 Gyan Prakash as Shiva's father
 Shobha Pradhan as Ronnie's mother
 Dolly Dotiwalla as Mrs. Cooper, the librarian
 Vicky Ahuja as Ranjeet
 Yogesh Pagare as young Ranjeet
 Raul Dias as Chikki
 Shishir Rungta as Samir
 Dr.Vilas Ujawane as Samir's father (Shiva's uncle)
 Meena Naik as Samir's mother (Shiva's aunt)
 Nayan Bhatt as Nayan, the maid
 Kannu Gill as Durga Masi (Radhika's aunt)
 Pratibha Goregaonkar as Mrs. Bhinde, Hindi teacher
 Amarnath Mukherjee as Mr. Bhalla
 Ramesh Goyal as Salim Bhai

See also
 List of Hindi horror shows

References

External links
 

1998 Indian television series debuts
Indian horror fiction television series
It (novel)
Television shows based on works by Stephen King
Zee TV original programming